Somatization is a tendency to experience and communicate psychological distress as bodily and organic symptoms and to seek medical help for them. More commonly expressed, it is the generation of physical symptoms of a psychiatric condition such as anxiety. The term somatization was introduced by Wilhelm Stekel in 1924.

Somatization is a worldwide phenomenon. A somatization spectrum can be identified, up to and including at one extreme somatization disorder.

Related psychological conditions
Somatization can be, but is not always, related to a psychological condition such as:
 Affective disorders (anxiety and depression)
 Somatoform disorders

The American Psychiatric Association (APA) has classified somatoform disorders in the DSM-IV and the World Health Organization (WHO) have classified these in the ICD-10.  Both classification systems use similar criteria. Most current practitioners will use one over the other, though in cases of borderline diagnoses, both systems may be referred to. In spite of extensive research over the last 20 years, researchers are still perplexed by somatoform disorders.

Ego defense
In psychodynamic theory, somatization is conceptualized as an ego defense, the unconscious rechannelling of repressed emotions into somatic symptoms as a form of symbolic communication (organ language).

Sigmund Freud's famous case study of Anna O. featured a woman who suffered from numerous physical symptoms, which Freud believed were the result of repressed grief over her father's illness, although treatment did not resolve her symptoms and later research is skeptical of Freud's diagnosis.

Children

While it is normal for stresses and strains in a child's life to be expressed in bodily pains/upsets, there is evidence that children in families where bodily complaints receive special attention are significantly more likely to use somatization as a defence in later life.

Treatment

Treatment for somatic symptom disorders combine different strategies for managing the patient's symptoms, including regularly scheduled outpatient visits, psychosocial interventions (such as joint meetings with family members), psychoeducation, and treatment of prominent comorbid symptoms of anxiety or depression.

Based on multiple systematic reviews, the initial suggested treatment for somatic disorder is regular, scheduled outpatient visits (every 4–8 weeks) that are not based on active symptoms. These visits should focus on establishing a therapeutic alliance, legitimizing the somatic symptoms, and limiting diagnostic tests and referral to specialists.

Cultural examples

Author Virginia Woolf's mental and emotional difficulties were often expressed directly in physical symptoms: "Such 'sensations' spread over my spine & head...the horror – physically like a painful wave about the heart".

See also
 Psychosomatic medicine
 Amplification (psychology)
 Hypochondriasis
 Medically unexplained physical symptoms
 The Nocebo effect: A similar effect of symptoms being caused by psychological effects.

References

External links 
 Pain and Somatization

Somatic symptom disorders
Defence mechanisms